NotJustOk is a Nigerian music download website created in June 2006 by Ademola Ogundele. With over 1.2 million viewers per month, from 183 countries, it is one of the most visited websites in Nigeria.

History
Coined from Seth Godin's book Purple Cow: Transform Your Business by Being Remarkable, NotJustOk was started as a personal blog by Ademola Ogundele in 2006. It evolved into a music website after Ademola posted a clip of 9ice's performance at Nelson Mandela's 90th anniversary concert, which rapidly increased the traffic of the website. Currently with few employees, NotJustOk is managed by Ademola Ogundele and Ovie Ofugara.

Overview
Described as "a revolution in Nigerian music" by Isioma Osaje of YNaija, NotJustOk delivers music and music videos from the hip hop and contemporary music genres. It also allows artists to upload their songs to the public through an online platform called MyNotJustOk. The website contributed to the sales of popular music albums, including Superstar by Wizkid, The W Experience by Banky W, C.E.O by Da Grin, and M.I.2 by M.I.

NotJustOk was voted the "Best Nigerian Music Website" at the City People Entertainment Awards in 2011, 2012, 2013 and 2014. It was also voted "Blog of The Year" at the 2013 edition of the Nigeria Entertainment Awards.

NotJustOk Music Concert
NotjustOk Music Concert is an annual music concert organised by NotJustOk. The first NotJustOk Music Concert was held on 17 December 2011.

Awards and nominations

References

External links
 

Nigerian music websites
Music review websites
Internet properties established in 2010
Online magazines published in Nigeria